Best Man Wins is a 1948 American historical drama film directed by John Sturges and starring Edgar Buchanan, Anna Lee and Robert Shayne. It was produced and distributed by Columbia Pictures. It it based on the story The Celebrated Jumping Frog of Calaveras County by Mark Twain.

Plot

The year is 1853 when inveterate gambler Jim Smiley (Edgar Buchanan) returns to his hometown of Dawson's Landing in Missouri after being away for a decade from his wife and son. He brings a jumping frog which he calls Daniel Webster with him, and immediately upon his arrival to the town hotel makes a bet with Sheriff Dingle (Stanley Andrews) and a few others, that the frog can jump when told to do so. He wins the bet and is able to pay for his stay at the hotel with the money.

Next he visits his wife Nancy (Anna Lee), who turns out to be his ex-wife and is about to marry the town judge, Leonidas K. Carter (Robert Shayne). He still gets to meet his son, Bob (Gary Gray), who he has never met before. To make amends and win the boy's heart, he intends to buy him a racing Greyhound.

Jim manages to gather a sum of $300 to buy a certain dog that Bob has set his eyes on, Andrew Jackson III, and Bob trains it to race it in an upcoming contest. But Bob is made fun of by one of the judge's own spoiled sons, Monty (Bill Sheffield), and Jim becomes determined to win back both his son and his wife from the snobby Leonidas.

Jim begins by renouncing gambling altogether and getting a job at the local hotel. He relapses however, by placing a bet on the judge's prize runner to win the race. Instead Bob's dog wins the race, and Jim feels guilty over having lied to Nancy and let his son down by not believing in him. Since Nancy believes he is a reformed man she agrees to marry him again.

When the wedding day comes, Jim still feels bad about his lies, when he discovers that Bob and Monty are betting. He tries to teach his son about the perils of gambling, but his guilty conscience makes him cancel the wedding. The judge also tries to stop the wedding by challenging Jim's ability to pay for the ceremony, which costs about $1,000.

The challenge turns into a bet, where Jim stakes $1,000 that his frog will beat his friend Amos' (Hobart Cavanaugh) leaper, Martha Washington. Jim goes on to fix the race, but refuses to accept his prize money when he wins. In doing so, he restores his dignity in front of Nancy. Jim layer confesses to Nancy about the bet on the previous dog race, but she is still happy about his new honest behaviour and agrees to remarry him anyway.

Cast

 Edgar Buchanan as Jim Smiley
 Anna Lee as Nancy Smiley
 Robert Shayne as Judge Leonidas K. Carter
 Gary Gray as Bob Smiley
 Hobart Cavanaugh as Amos
 Stanley Andrews ad Sheriff Dingle
 George Lynn as Mr. Crow
 Bill Sheffield as Monty Carter
 Marietta Canty as Hester

References

External links
 
  
 

1948 films
Columbia Pictures films
Films directed by John Sturges
Films about gambling
Films based on short fiction
Films based on works by Mark Twain
Films set in 1853
Films set in Missouri
American historical drama films
1940s historical drama films
American black-and-white films
1948 drama films
1940s American films
1940s English-language films